An-doughnut (Japanese: あんドーナツ, Romaji: an-dōnatsu) is a Japanese doughnut filled with red bean paste. It is a confection created in Japan, along with anpan, Jam pan, cream pan, curry bread, and many others.  It is unknown when an-doughnut was created in Japan. However, Mister Donut in Japan added an-doughnuts to its menu in December 1983.

See also
 Chapssal doughnut
Jelly doughnut
List of doughnut varieties

References

Doughnuts
Japanese breads
Japanese desserts and sweets
Palauan desserts
Sweet breads